Jamie Stevenson may refer to:
Jamie Stevenson (orienteer) (born 1975), British orienteer
Jamie Stevenson (Australian footballer) (born 1966), Australian rules footballer
Jamie Stevenson (Scottish footballer) (born 1984), Scottish footballer

See also  
James Stevenson (disambiguation)